Cantata++, or simply Cantata in newer versions, is a commercial computer program for dynamic testing, specifically unit testing and integration testing, and code coverage at run time of C and C++ programs. It is developed and sold by QA Systems, and was formerly a product of IPL Information Processing Ltd.

Overview 
Cantata and Cantata++ were originally developed by IPL Information Processing Systems until 2012 when QA Systems GmbH acquired the business, and founded QA Systems Ltd in Bath (UK). In November 2012 the tool was rebranded at version 6.2 as Cantata. As of  2018 there have been 23 Cantata versions released since its initial release in 1992.

The IDE of Cantata is based on Eclipse.
Cantata belongs to a category of code-driven unit testing frameworks used for dynamic testing of software. These tools bring compiled test cases to execution with the linked-in code under test. The test executable will run on a computing platform, a native operating system, or a target platform. The integration of debuggers is optional.

Typical users of Cantata are either developers of application software programmed in C and C++, or of system software designed for embedded systems and mobile devices.

Industrial use 

The development and verification of functional safety software in many industries is governed by international regulatory standards. Therein requirements can be found which relate to functional Safety and how to ensure a certain Safety Integrity Level (SIL). Each of the standards below highly recommends or mandates the use of unit testing and integration testing with a code-driven testing framework:

Aerospace (RTCA: DO-178B and DO-178C : Software Considerations in Airborne Systems and Equipment Certification)
Automotive (ISO 26262: Road vehicles – Functional safety)
Energy/Nuclear Power (IEC 60880 : Nuclear power plants – instrumentation and control systems important to safety – Software aspects for computer based systems performing category A functions)
Industrial Automation (IEC 61508 : Functional Safety of Electrical/Electronic/Programmable Electronic Safety-related Systems)
Medical Devices (IEC 62304 : Medical device software – Software lifecycle processes)
Railways (EN 50128 & EN 50129: Railway applications – Communications, signalling and processing systems – Software for railway control and protection systems)
Munition Related Computing Systems (NATO AOP-52: Software Safety Design and Munition-Related Computing Systems) 

Cantata may be used in each of these sectors to meet the verification requirements of the regulatory standard. The Cantata tool has been independently classified and certified by the functional safety certification body SGS-TÜV GmbH, as “usable in the development of safety related software” to the highest safety integrity level in each of the above standards.
The mapping of verification and validation requirements in each of the above standards for functional software testing, robustness testing and structural testing (code coverage) to the capabilities of Cantata are available from the vendor, together with tool certification kits for IS0 26262, IEC 60880, IEC 61508, IEC 62304 and EN 50128, and tool qualification kits for DO-178B and DO-178C/DO-330.

References

Further reading 
 Peter Liggesmeyer: Software-Qualität: Testen, Analysieren und Verifizieren von Software. Spektrum, Akademischer Verlag, Heidelberg, Berlin, 2002, .
 Rune Winther, Bjoern Axel Gran, Gustav Dahll: "Computer Safety, Reliability, and Security: 24th International Conference, SAFECOMP 2005, Fredrikstad, Norway, September 28–30, 2005, Proceedings." Springer-Verlag GmbH, 2005, .
 Dorothy Graham, Mark Fewster: "Experiences of Test Automation: Case Studies of Software Test Automation." Addison-Wesley Longman, Amsterdam 2012, .
 Patricia Rodríguez Dapena: "Software Safety Verification in Critical Software Intensive Systems." Eindhoven: Universiteit Eindhoven, 2002, .
 
 Cantata White-Box Testing tested by MIT An Empirical Evaluation of the MC/DC Coverage Criterion on the HETE-2 Satellite Software called 8-15-14
 Cantata Feature Brief for Embedded xUnit tests Website of QA-Systems, called 6-30-14

External links 

History of computing in the United Kingdom
Software testing tools
Unit testing frameworks